Ardfinnan Woollen Mills was a former wool mill, trading under messrs Mulcahy-Redmond and Co. Ltd. and located in the Suir Valley at the village of Ardfinnan, County Tipperary, Ireland.  Founded in 1869, it manufactured woollen and worsted cloth, specialising in tweed and suitings for the tailoring trade.  It briefly produced a unique weatherproof cloth, while later in its history turning to off-the-peg suits it became noted as the only firm in the Republic of Ireland completing all processes of clothing manufacture.  A leading industry in Irish textiles, it closed in 1973 with the loss of over 100 employees.

History

Early history 

In 1867 J. Mulcahy from County Cork, who had knowledge in the wool trade, proposed to establish a woollen mill on the River Suir at Ardfinnan with the help of his investing friend J. Redmond.  On the site of a former gristmill which had been in existence since before the early 17th century, it was built in 1869 adjoining the historic river crossing point at Ardfinnan bridge, underneath Ardfinnan Castle.  The under-flowing Suir powered wool spinning machinery in an exceptionally tall four-story building via a water turbine and was utilized for the washing and dying processes of the locally sheared wool, produced by sheep in the surrounding Galtee and Knockmealdown mountains.  Other cloth manufacturing stages were performed in separate buildings, while the process of 'tentering' was performed at the banks of the Suir on the village green.  The mill office was located within the only surviving section of the gristmill that had formerly occupied the site and which provided access to the mill from Barrack Street via its adjoining gate.  Using a New Jersey built water turbine from T.C. Alcott & Son, it was among only two such industries in Munster to employ a water turbine as a source of power, those being Ashgrove Woollen Mills and Kerry Woollen Mills.  Ardfinnan blankets and tweed gained a reputation for fine quality and variety.

In 1881 the main four-story mill building burnt down along with Mr. Mulcahy's adjoining dwelling at Mill House.  Production was rectified by 1882 with the completion of smaller replacement two-storey buildings.  Employment numbers were reduced to approximately 100. Rows of cottages were built by the company to house its workforce, of which had a large influence on the growth of the village and later Ardfinnan GAA as the men often played football on the green opposite the mill after a days work.  Electricity generated by the mill's water turbine was later provided to a total of 14 homes in Ardfinnan and all of its electric street lights until the ESB introduced the Rural Electrification Scheme which took over the supply in January 1953.

Mulcahy, Redmond & Co. was selected to represent the Irish Woollen Industry along with 12 other firms at the Cork International Exhibition of 1902.  HM King Edward VII was present at this exhibition and it was when he was en route to Lismore Castle in Waterford that he stopped at Mulcahy, Redmond & Co. out of genial curiosity.

Galtee Motor Cloth 
In 1906 the firm patented the Galtee Motor Cloth, an innovative cloth combining warmth with a waterproof-breathable functionality.  Named after the Galtee Mountains and evoking the inclement Irish weather, it was claimed to be "the warmest cloth ever made for motoring coats".  It was a layered cloth of Irish frieze and merino wool woven with mohair from the Angora goat.  It would be slightly porous when dry, therefore crucially breathable and thus hygienic.  However, when the outer surface became wet, the pores of the cloth closed due to its contraction and subsequently became rainproof.

Royal patronage was received in late 1906 when HM King Edward VII commissioned the firm to make their Galtee Motor Cloth with his bespoke specifications.  After being tailored into a fine coat on Saville Row (possibly at Henry Poole & Co), he expressed his delight for the quality of the versatile garment which he comfortably used on his motor drives.  Irish motoring pioneer Richard J. Mecredy, remarked in 1908, "We have used one of these coats for several years, and find it perfect from every point of view", highlighting that it truly was waterproof not only after continuous use, but also when exposed to a water hose. In Great Britain and Ireland, the Galtee Motor Cloth became popular for bespoke tailored car coats.  Ready-made coats were first supplied by Pim Bros.

For inclement weather conditions on the road, these woollen coats were superior in their multi-purpose functionality to either fur coats, rubber Mackintosh or cotton gabardine Burberry raincoats.  High market demand was brief however, as the introduction of car windshields made weatherproof motoring coats obsolete.  Galtee Cloth can be seen as the predecessor to the cotton Grenfell Cloth, created in 1923 for similar, yet harsher weather conditions.

1914 - 1960s

The British War Office made large contracts with Mulcahy-Redmond during the First World War to produce khaki serge for military uniforms.  Despite large success, some war contracts were turned down due to the still relatively small size of the mill.  The 6th Marquess of Waterford, Lord Henry Beresford had overhauled his successful woollen mill at Kilmacthomas with first-rate machinery in 1910, only to soon die in 1911 and after which the family mill was sold to Stevenson Brothers of Staffordshire, England, who closed the mill and transferred its machinery to Ardfinnan Woollen Mills in the 1920s.  Under the direction of W.J Mulcahy (in place of his deceased brother and father), this resulted in a large expanse of Mulcahy-Redmond on to the opposite side of Barrack Street and hugely increased productivity.  Ardfinnan cloths were used by principle tailors in London, Paris and New York.

Demand from the Irish market soared with the Anglo-Irish Trade War following the policy of protectionism.  It was termed a 'Free State Woollen Mill' and cloth was often commissioned for Éamon de Valera, as seen during his travels to the League of Nations.  Following the Second World War and then in its third generation of Mulcahy directorship, the firm established a Men's & Boy's ready-made clothing department employing over 70 female workers, making Mulcahy-Redmond & Co. the only firm within the Republic of Ireland that was completing all stages of clothing manufacture from raw wool to a wearable garment.  During this period the firm employed a recorded 220 workers.  The construction of garment manufacturing facilities was followed by the erection of a larger office space located on the opposite side of Barrack Street.

The 1960s saw international prestige increase for the firm.  In both 1961 and 1962, Ardfinnan thornproof tweeds won the Premier London Award and Georgian Silver Cup at international level in London.  At the 1965 Leipzig Trade Fair in Germany, a gold medal was awarded for the firms bouclé tweed.  The decade also saw contracts signed for cloth for Macy's Herald Square department store in New York to use in their made-to-measure clothing.  However, the firms ready-made clothing ranges struggled to compete with cheaper Asian imports.  Ardfinnan Knitting Wool and knitting patterns were exported primarily to the UK and remained profitable along with their tweed suitings.

Closure
With up to 500 people dependent on the mill, over 100 workers were left unemployed when the firm closed in early January 1973 due to a competitive disadvantage with the onslaught of cheaper imports, largely taking its toll with Ireland's admission to the EEC.  The firm had run into financial debt of over £200,000.  Its closure resulted in a large protest in the nearby town of Clonmel as promises by the Fianna Fail government to sustain the mill through financial aid of £250,000 were not followed through.  Youghal Carpets was the only Irish industry to receive such financial aid.

Trade showrooms were located on Dublin's South William Street.  The company's former Dublin offices were at Ardfinnan House, 17 Trinity Street, Dublin 2.  The steel plate name Ardfinnan House remains on the building.  Their United Kingdom partner was at Londonderry House, Chichester Street, Belfast.

References 

Textile companies of Ireland
Woollen mills
County Tipperary
1869 establishments in Ireland